Sumat is a settlement in Kenya's Garissa County.

References 

Populated places in North Eastern Province (Kenya)
Garissa County